Joseph Kenneth Hargreaves, MBE, KSG (1 March 1939–23 June 2012) was the Conservative Member of Parliament for Hyndburn, Lancashire between 1983 and 1992, when he lost his seat to Greg Pope of Labour. A chartered secretary and company administrator by profession, he served as a local councillor and was the Mayor of Hyndburn in 1979, four years before his election to Parliament.

In 1990, Hargreaves, together with Liberal Democrat MP David Alton (now Lord Alton of Liverpool), founded the Movement for Christian Democracy (now the Christian Peoples Alliance) and served as Vice-Chairman. After his defeat at the 1992 general election, he worked for Conservative Central Office as a liaison with local Conservative Clubs.

In the 2005 general election, he supported the unsuccessful Conservative candidate James Mawdsley. Hargreaves was given an Order of the British Empire for services to the community in Lancashire in Queen Elizabeth II’s New Year Honours on 29 December 2006.

Shortly before his death in 2012, Hargreaves was honoured with a Papal Knighthood of the Order of St Gregory the Great. He died on 23 June 2012 at the East Lancashire Hospice in Blackburn. A devout Roman Catholic, he was a parishioner of St Mary’s RC Church in Oswaldtwistle in his former constituency.

’==Affiliations==
 Pro-life lobby group: Right to Life
 President: Accrington and District Blind Society
 President: Hyndburn Arthritis Care
 Chairman of the Trustees: Maundy Relief
 Disabled Association for Sport in Hyndburn

References

External links 
 

1939 births
2012 deaths
Conservative Party (UK) MPs for English constituencies
English activists
English Roman Catholics
Knights of St. Gregory the Great
Mayors of places in Lancashire
Members of the Order of the British Empire
Politics of Hyndburn
UK MPs 1983–1987
UK MPs 1987–1992